Ionuț Andrei (born 20 December 1985) is a Romanian bobsledder who has competed since 2004. He finished 15th in the four-man event at the 2010 Winter Olympics in Vancouver.

At the FIBT World Championships, Andrei earned his best finish of 18th in the four-man event at Lake Placid, New York in 2009.

He was born in Schitu Golești.

References

External links

1985 births
Bobsledders at the 2010 Winter Olympics
Living people
Olympic bobsledders of Romania
Romanian male bobsledders